Laura Clayton (born December 8, 1943) is an American pianist and composer. She was born in Lexington, Kentucky, and studied at the Peabody Conservatory in Baltimore and at Columbia University, New York, with Mario Davidovsky. She began studying composition with Darius Milhaud at the Aspen Music School and graduated with a Master of Music in Composition from the New England Conservatory in Boston. She lived for a while in Brazil and then continued her studies at the University of Michigan, graduating with a Doctorate of Musical Arts.

After completing her education, she worked as a composer. In 1980, her work was chosen to represent the United States at the International Rostrum of Composers.

Her compositional style has been describes as rhythmically complex with a ‘highly refined sense of mystery’, inspired by images of nature. Cree Songs for the Newborn, based on creole poems, was chosen to represent the USA at the 1980 UNESCO International Rostrum of Composers in Paris.

Honors and awards
Charles Ives Prize from the American Academy and Institute of Arts and Letters, 1980
Walter B. Hinrichsen Award
NEA awards
Jerome Foundation grant
University of Michigan grant
Alice M. Ditson Fund grant
Guggenheim Foundation grant, 1984
MacDowell Fellow

Works
Chamber Music

 Mobile no. 2, for voice and piano, 1975
 O Train Azul for guitar, 1977
 Cree Songs to the Newborn for Soprano and chamber orchestra, 1987
 Passagio, for piano, 1978
 Herself the Tide, for Soprano and piano, 1981
 Panels, for chamber ensemble, 1983
 Clara's Sea, for women's voices, 1988
 Joie, for piano, 1990

Orchestral Music

 Sagarama with piano, 1984
 Terra Lucida, 1988

Tape

 Implosure for two dancers, slide and tape, 1977
 Simichai-ya, sax, echoplex, tape, 1987

References

1943 births
Living people
20th-century classical composers
21st-century classical composers
American women classical composers
American classical composers
American music educators
American women music educators
Aspen Music Festival and School alumni
Musicians from Lexington, Kentucky
Peabody Institute alumni
Columbia University alumni
New England Conservatory alumni
University of Michigan School of Music, Theatre & Dance alumni
Pupils of Darius Milhaud
21st-century American composers
20th-century American women musicians
20th-century American musicians
20th-century American composers
Kentucky women musicians
21st-century American women musicians
20th-century women composers
21st-century women composers